The Zion Lutheran Church is a historic Lutheran church building at 132 Glenbrook Road in Stamford, Connecticut.  The red brick Gothic Revival structure was built in 1925 by a German immigrant congregation founded in 1897.  It is the city's only red brick church.  The main facade is dominated by a square tower on the right, which rises only to the height of the roof gable on the left.  The gable stands above a large quadruple window set in a slightly pointed arch, which stands above the main entrance, which is recessed in an arched opening.

The property was added to the National Register of Historic Places in 1987.

See also
National Register of Historic Places listings in Stamford, Connecticut

References

German-American culture in Connecticut
Churches on the National Register of Historic Places in Connecticut
Gothic Revival church buildings in Connecticut
Churches completed in 1925
Churches in Stamford, Connecticut
National Register of Historic Places in Fairfield County, Connecticut